Swami Ayyappan is a 1975 Hindu devotional film. Directed and produced by P. Subramaniam, it was simultaneously shot in Malayalam and Tamil. It stars Gemini Ganesan, Thikkurissy Sukumaran Nair, Master Raghu/Karan, K. Balaji, Sekhar, Srividya, Unnimary, Lakshmi, Raghavan, Rani Chandra and Vinodini. The film met with critical acclaim and became a box office success. It won four Kerala State Film Awards. The film helped in popularising the  shrine of Sabarimala further in Tamilnadu and other southern Indian states.

Cast 

Master Raghu (childhood) and Master Sekhar (adolescence) as Manikandan
Gemini Ganesan as Pandalam raja
Srividya as Pandalam Maharani
Thikkurissy Sukumaran Nair as Guru
Lakshmi as Mohini
Sukumari as Muthaliyar's wife
Sudheer
Raghavan as Prabhakaran
Rajasree
Unnimary as Maalikapurathamma
Baby Sumathi as Young girl
Baby Vinodini
T.M.S
K. Balaji as Vavar
Rani Chandra
R. S. Manohar
Madhu  (guest role )

Soundtrack 
The music is composed by G. Devarajan.

Accolades 
 Kerala State Film Awards
 Best Film with Popular Appeal and Aesthetic Value – Swami Ayyappan
 Best Child Artist – Master Raghu/Karan
 Best Cinematography – Masthan
 Best Lyrics – Vayalar Ramavarma

Legacy 
The song "Harivarasanam" sung by K. J. Yesudas and composed (in Madhyamavati raga) by G. Devarajan for the film later became part of the daily routine of Sabarimala Temple. It is played every night during the closing ceremony of the temple.

References

External links 
 

1970s Malayalam-language films
1970s Tamil-language films
1975 films
1975 multilingual films
Films directed by P. Subramaniam
Hindu mythological films
Indian multilingual films